Mal Hajji (also Romanized as Māl Ḩājjī) is a village in Jowzar Rural District, in the Central District of Mamasani County, Fars Province, Iran. At the 2006 census, its population was 153, in 36 families.

References 

Populated places in Mamasani County